Wemple is a hamlet in Albany County, New York, United States.

Notes

Hamlets in Albany County, New York
Hamlets in New York (state)